

206001–206100 

|-bgcolor=#f2f2f2
| colspan=4 align=center | 
|}

206101–206200 

|-id=185
| 206185 Yip ||  || Ching-Wa Yip (born 1974), an astronomer from Hong Kong and contributor to the Sloan Digital Sky Survey || 
|}

206201–206300 

|-id=241
| 206241 Dubois ||  || Eugène Dubois (1858–1940), Dutch anatomist, surgeon and paleontologist and one of the founders of palaeoanthropology, the study of the formation and the development of the specific characteristics of humans || 
|}

206301–206400 

|-bgcolor=#f2f2f2
| colspan=4 align=center | 
|}

206401–206500 

|-bgcolor=#f2f2f2
| colspan=4 align=center | 
|}

206501–206600 

|-bgcolor=#f2f2f2
| colspan=4 align=center | 
|}

206601–206700 

|-bgcolor=#f2f2f2
| colspan=4 align=center | 
|}

206701–206800 

|-bgcolor=#f2f2f2
| colspan=4 align=center | 
|}

206801–206900 

|-bgcolor=#f2f2f2
| colspan=4 align=center | 
|}

206901–207000 

|-bgcolor=#f2f2f2
| colspan=4 align=center | 
|}

References 

206001-207000